At the Family Dog Ballroom is a recording of a 1969 performance by the San Francisco rock band Jefferson Airplane at the Family Dog Ballroom in San Francisco. Released on CD in the United Kingdom, the album is a digipak offering of material only recently rediscovered.  A poster is included.

Track listing
"The Ballad of You and Me and Pooneil" (Paul Kantner) – 15:16
"Good Shepherd" (traditional, arranged by Jorma Kaukonen) – 6:51
"We Can Be Together" (Kantner) – 5:49
"Somebody to Love" (Darby Slick) – 3:53
"The Farm" (Kantner, Gary Blackman) – 2:55
"Crown of Creation" (Kantner) – 3:07
"Come Back Baby" (traditional, arranged by Kaukonen) – 5:43
"Wooden Ships" (David Crosby, Kantner, Stephen Stills) – 6:10
"Volunteers" (Marty Balin, Kantner) – 2:25
Jam (Kantner, Kaukonen, Casady, Dryden, Jerry Garcia) – 26:04

Personnel
Marty Balin – vocals
Grace Slick – vocals
Paul Kantner – vocals, rhythm guitar
Jorma Kaukonen – lead guitar, vocals
Jack Casady – bass
Spencer Dryden – drums, percussion
Jerry Garcia – guitar on "Jam"

References

Jefferson Airplane live albums
2007 live albums